A dive log is a record of the diving history of an underwater diver. The log may either be in a book, locally hosted software, or web based. The log serves purposes both related to safety and personal records. Information in a log may contain the date, time and location, the profile of the dive, equipment used, air usage, above and below water conditions, including temperature, current, wind and waves, general comments, and verification by the buddy, instructor or supervisor.

In case of a diving accident, it can provide valuable data regarding a diver's previous experience, as well as the other factors that might have led to the accident itself.

Recreational divers are generally advised to keep a logbook as a record, while professional divers may be legally obliged to maintain a logbook which is up to date and complete in its records. The professional diver's logbook is a legal document and may be important for getting employment. The required content and formatting of the professional diver's logbook is generally specified by the registration authority, but may also be specified by an industry association such as the International Marine Contractors Association (IMCA).

Contents of the logbook
Typical fields in a recreational diver's log book would be the following:

Header - Contains basic information about the date, time and location of the dive.
Profile - Records sufficient detail to show the profile of the dive.
Equipment - Shows what the diver was wearing and what dive gear was used during the dive.
Conditions - Allows the diver to record what the environment was like (both above and below water).
Comments - Used for any general information not covered in other sections.
Verification - used to record the signature and certification details of the buddy / instructor that was with the diver during the dive.

A more minimalistic log book for recreational divers who are only interested in keeping a record of their accumulated experience (total number of dives and total amount of time underwater), could just contain the first point of the above list and the maximum depth of the dive.

A commercial diver's logbook may be considered a legal document, and may contain more information, both about the diver, and about each dive recorded. It is generally verified by the diving supervisor for each diving operation.
It may include the following sections:
 Personal details of the diver
 Medical certificates of fitness to dive and notes
 Qualifications and certificates
 Training record
 Competence assessment record
 Record of dives
 Medical records illness or injury
 Cumulative diving experience
The record of each dive may contain:
 Date of the dive
 Signature of the diver
 Name and address of the diving contractor
 Dive location
 Vessel or installation from which the dive is done
 Type of dive (Surface oriented or saturation)
 For bell bounce or surface dives:
 Maximum depth of the dive
 Time left surface or started pressurisation
 Bottom time
 Time that decompression was completed
 Details of any surface decompression, including surface interval and time in the chamber
 Accumulated bottom time
 Accumulated total time under pressure 
 For saturation dives:
 Storage depth
 Maximum depth of dive
 Bell lock-off time
 Time that diver left bell
 Time that diver returned to bell
 Lock-out duration
 Bell lock-on time
 Accumulated number of lock-outs
 Accumulated total time under pressure
 Details of work done and equipment used:
 Breathing apparatus used
 Breathing mixture used
 Work description, equipment and tools used
 Name of decompression schedules used
 Notes regarding any decompression incident or other illness or injury
 Any other relevant comments
 Name and signature of the diving supervisor for the dive
 Diving contractor's official company stamp

Dive log software 
Usually dive computer manufactures have their own software to view and analyze logged dive profiles, but there are also open source versions. Subsurface is free open source dive log software started by Linus Torvalds, which is compatible with several makes of downloadable diving computer.

Sources 

Underwater diving procedures
Records management